The San Rafael River train disaster occurred on August 10, 1989, when the Rio Bamoa Bridge collapsed under an 11-car train operated by Ferrocarriles Nacionales de México and traveling from Mazatlan to Mexicali. Several cars fell into the San Rafael River. The bridge's supports had been damaged by heavy rains, causing them to fail. Of the approximately 330 people on the train, 112 perished, most by drowning, and 205 were injured, resulting as Mexico's second deadliest peacetime rail disaster.

References 

Railway accidents in 1989
Derailments in Mexico
1989 in Mexico
Bridge disasters caused by scour damage
Bridge disasters in Mexico